Oulimnius is a genus of riffle beetles in the family Elmidae. There are about 15 described species in Oulimnius.

Species
These 15 species belong to the genus Oulimnius:

 Oulimnius aegyptiacus (Kuwert, 1890)
 Oulimnius bertrandi Berthélemy, 1964
 Oulimnius cyneticus Berthélemy, 1980
 Oulimnius echiinatus Berthélemy, 1979
 Oulimnius fuscipes (Reiche, 1879)
 Oulimnius hipponensis Berthélemy, 1979
 Oulimnius jaechi Hernando, Ribera & Aguilera, 1998
 Oulimnius latiusculus (LeConte, 1866)
 Oulimnius maurus Berthélemy, 1979
 Oulimnius nitidulus (Leconte, 1866)
 Oulimnius perezi (Sharp, 1872)
 Oulimnius reygassei (Peyerimhoff, 1929)
 Oulimnius troglodytes (Gyllenhal, 1827)
 Oulimnius tuberculatus (Müller, 1806)
 Oulimnius villosus Berthélemy, 1979

References

Further reading

External links

 

Elmidae
Articles created by Qbugbot